Harrie Jansen (born 25 January 1947) is a former Dutch racing cyclist.

He was born in Amsterdam and is a brother of Jan Jansen. At the 1968 Summer Olympics he finished 24th in the road race.

See also
 List of Dutch Olympic cyclists

References

1947 births
Living people
Dutch male cyclists
Cyclists at the 1968 Summer Olympics
Olympic cyclists of the Netherlands
Cyclists from Amsterdam